Sri Lakshmi Narayanan Temple is a Hindu temple located in the metropolitan city of Seoul. This temple is dedicated to lord Vishnu. The temple serves as the cultural and religious center for Korean Hindus and immigrants from South Asian countries. Devotees visit this temple to fulfil their religious rituals and organise traditional programs related to Yoga and Vedanta.

See also
 Buddhism in Korea
 Hinduism in Korea
 Indians in Korea
 Koreans in India
 Korean Shamanism
 Memorial of Heo Hwang-ok, Ayodhya 
 India–South Korea relations
 India – North Korea relations
 List of Hindu temples in South Korea
 List of Hindu temples outside India
 Silk Road transmission of Buddhism

References
  

Religious buildings and structures in Seoul
Hindu temples in South Korea